The Fisher Boy is a painting by the Dutch Golden Age painter Frans Hals, painted in the early 1630s, now in the Royal Museum of Fine Arts Antwerp.

Painting 
This painting was documented by Hofstede de Groot in 1910, who wrote "49. DE STRANDLOOPER VAN HAARLEM (The Haarlem Fisher-Boy). B. 37 ; M. 254. Half-length ; life size. A fisher-boy, seen in full face, laughs at the spectator. His arms are folded on his breast. He wears a little cap ; his hair is in disorder. He wears a jacket with broad sleeves, and carries a basket on his back. At the back is a landscape ; to the right is the sea. [Possibly identical with 55, 58a, and 58c.] Signed on the left with the intertwined letters " F. H." ; canvas, 30 inches by 25 1/2 inches. Sale. Alphonse Oudry, Paris, April 16 and 20, 1869. In the possession of the Paris dealer Ch. Sedelmeyer, " Catalogue of 300 Paintings," 1898, No. 46. In the Antwerp Museum, 1905 catalogue, No. 188. "

Hofstede de Groot noted several fisherboys by Hals along with this one (catalogue numbers 49 through to 58c). This painting was also documented by W.R. Valentiner in 1923.

Other fisher folk by Hals:

References

Paintings by Frans Hals
Paintings in the collection of the Royal Museum of Fine Arts Antwerp
1630s paintings